Hajduki Nyskie  is a village in the administrative district of Gmina Nysa, within Nysa County, Opole Voivodeship, in south-western Poland.

Notable residents
 Otto Kretschmer (1912–1998), German U-boat commander and Admiral

References

Hajduki Nyskie